Warren James Feeney (born 17 January 1981) is a football manager and former Northern Ireland international footballer, who is currently manager of Welling United.

In making his debut for the Northern Ireland national team, he became the third generation of his family to receive an international cap, after his father Warren Feeney, Sr. and grandfather Jim Feeney.

Playing career

Early career
Feeney attended Ashfield Boys' High School. He started his career when he joined St Andrews, once scoring 54 goals in one season. He signed as a trainee with Leeds United, in 1998, but never made the league side and was loaned out to AFC Bournemouth in 2001.

AFC Bournemouth
After 10 loan games, the loan to Bournemouth became permanent and he finally played in 108 games for Bournemouth, scoring 36 goals, before leaving at the end of the 2003–04 season.

Stockport County
He joined Stockport County from Bournemouth for a fee of £45,000, making over 30 appearances for them, and scoring 15 goals, but in spite of his contribution the club were relegated at the end of the season.

Luton Town
Feeney moved on to Luton Town for £150,000. He did not have a great start to his Luton career, scoring only 6 goals in 30 starts and 18 substitute appearances in the 2005–06 season, and although he finally clocked up 77 appearances in all, he only managed a haul of 8 goals in total, and in March 2007, he was allowed to join Cardiff City on loan

Cardiff City

At the end of his loan spell at Cardiff he agreed a three-year deal with the club, but he failed to find the net in a competitive game, his only goal coming in a pre-season friendly against Dutch side FC Twente. However, considering the deal he had just signed it was perhaps surprising when he was loaned to Swansea City for four months from 21 August 2007

Swansea City
He scored his first goal for Swansea on 2 October, in a 2–1 win over Swindon Town and began to establish himself in the side, scoring 5 goals in ten matches, but on 15 December, while playing for Swansea in a match against Southend United he sustained injury to an ankle ligament after a heavy tackle by Lewis Hunt. His injury  ended his opportunity of a permanent switch to Swansea, who had already held talks with Cardiff about a permanent deal.

Warren's grandfather, Jim Feeney had also played for Swansea in the 1940s, and also won international caps for Northern Ireland – they were the first grandfather/grandson to have played for the Swans.

In January 2008, Swansea manager Roberto Martínez put an end to the transfer speculation by stating that "it is going to be very, very difficult to agree something over Warren" meaning that he will not be moving to them in January but Martínez also mentioned that a summer move would not be out of the question.

Cardiff City
Back at Cardiff, he returned from the injury in March 2008, coming on as a 90th-minute substitute for Paul Parry during a 1–0 win over Hull City but suffered another injury two weeks later during a 0–0 with West Bromwich Albion which ended his season.

Dundee United
In July 2008, Feeney joined fellow Cardiff City player Willo Flood on loan at Scottish Premier League side Dundee United. In only his third friendly game for Dundee United, he scored a hat-trick against Raith Rovers at Stark's Park, although he did not score his first competitive goal until November. He went on to score 6 league goals for the Scottish club by the end of the season, only for a groin injury to put an end to his loan spell.

Return to Cardiff
After returning to Cardiff again his injury woes continued, and in July 2009 it was reported on the BBC website that Feeney would miss the start of the 2009–10 season as he would undergo hip surgery, he would also miss vital World Cup games for Northern Ireland.
This problem was believed to have come to light during a medical with League One side Leeds United, the club where he started his career, but after failing this medical the move was called off.

He returned to action for Cardiff on 17 October 2009, when came on as a substitute for Chris Burke during a 1–1 draw with Crystal Palace.

Sheffield Wednesday
On 26 November 2009, Feeney joined Championship side Sheffield Wednesday on loan until the end of December. Cardiff manager Dave Jones stated that Feeney would return to Cardiff at the end of his loan spell after only playing 13 minutes for Sheffield Wednesday, during which time the manager who signed him, Brian Laws, was sacked after a string of poor results.

Oldham Athletic
Following Cardiff's playoff final defeat, the club released five players, including Feeney. On 14 July 2010, Feeney joined Football League One side Oldham Athletic. He scored his first and only goal for the club in a FA Cup first round match on 6 November 2010 against Accrington Stanley. On 3 August 2011, he had his contract terminated.

Plymouth Argyle
Feeney signed a one-year contract with Plymouth Argyle in August 2011. He made his debut in a 1–1 draw at Shrewsbury Town and scored his first goal in a 2–0 win against Macclesfield Town. Having made 30 appearances in his first season with Argyle, Feeney signed a one-year contract extension in May 2012. He scored a further three goals in 22 appearances in 2012–13 before a knee injury sidelined him for the rest of the campaign. Feeney was released at the end of the season, but returned on trial in July to try and earn a new contract, and scored in one of the club's friendly matches.

Salisbury City
He joined Salisbury City on 20 July 2013 as player-assistant manager to new manager Mikey Harris. He left the club at the end of the 2013–14 season, after becoming manager of Linfield.

Return to playing
Following the end of his professional career, Feeney often featured in games for charity organisation the Argyle Legends, a side made up of players all with a link to Plymouth Argyle.

In January 2019, Feeney represented Northern Ireland at the 2019 Star Sixes tournament. Later that month it was revealed that Feeney had signed for Cornish side Callington Town, of the South West Peninsula League; the 10th level of English football.

International career
Feeney is a former Northern Ireland international. He won 46 caps playing for his country, and also made eight appearances at under-21 level. He scored his first international goal against Azerbaijan in September 2005, also netting in a friendly against Portugal. His third goal came against Denmark in the Euro 2008 Qualifier, heading an equaliser in the 61st minute. In April 2009, Feeney scored his fifth and final international goal, the only goal of the game as Northern Ireland beat Slovenia 1–0 in a World Cup Qualifier.

International goals
Scores and results list Northern Ireland's goal tally first.

Managerial career

Linfield

On 26 April 2014, it was announced that Feeney would replace David Jeffrey as manager of NIFL Premiership side Linfield in his native city of Belfast, Northern Ireland. He officially took charge of the club on 1 May 2014, signing a two-year contract. Feeney later decided to combine his managerial role at the club with playing duties. He made his debut in a pre-season friendly against Loughgall on 24 June 2014, which Linfield won 2–1. His competitive debut as a player came at "Big Two" rivals Glentoran with Feeney coming on as a substitute in a 3–2 win.

His cousin, Lee Feeney, played for the club in two different spells between 1997–1999 and 2002–2003.

Newport County
On 6 October 2015 Feeney was appointed as assistant manager to John Sheridan at League Two club Newport County.

On 15 January 2016 Feeney was promoted to be the club's manager following Sheridan's move to Oldham. Andy Todd was appointed as his assistant manager.

Feeney ensured a good start to his tenure with a run of six wins in his first 11 games, gaining 21 points, and 21 points of a possible 36. As the season continued however, results then worsened, ending the season with a winless run of 11 games. Newport finished the season in 22nd place in League Two, avoiding relegation.

Newport started the 2016–17 season poorly with Newport County bottom of League Two by September, and after defeats against Grimsby and relegation rivals Cambridge United, Newport only had one win, and 6 points, from their opening 9 matches of the 2016–17 season. Feeney and Todd were sacked by Newport on 28 September 2016.

Newport captain Scott Bennett expressed his disappointment, stating he was "gutted" at the news of Feeney's departure. Feeney met Newport again in League Two the following season as assistant manager of Crawley, losing the fixture 2–1. A South Wales Argust columnist remarked one year on that Feeney thought the Newport board had been hasty in sacking him, given that his successor Graham Westley was sacked and Mike Flynn went on to lead the side to a spell of good form.

Crawley Town and Notts County
On 25 May 2017, Feeney was appointed assistant manager to Harry Kewell at Crawley Town. The duo led the side to a 14th-place finish in League Two for 2017–18.

The pair departed Crawley for Notts County in controversial fashion in August 2018, with some claiming Notts County were "raiding" the side of its best players including Enzio Boldewijn and Robert Milsom, after only 15 months in charge.

On 13 November 2018, Kewell and Feeney both left Notts County. The pair were only given ten weeks in charge of the side, winning only three of their fourteen fixtures.

Ards
In February 2019 Feeney returned to Northern Ireland as manager of NIFL Premiership side Ards. Feeney's father Warren Sr, grandfather, and his cousins Lee and Cullen have all played for the side during their careers. He appointed his cousin and former Ards forward Lee Feeney

He began the 2019–20 season well, leading the side off the bottom of the table for the first time in months and managing a 3–1 victory against Newry to put the club in the 11th-placed play-off slot. He nearly ensured survival for Ards after a late run to secure 13 points from the last nine games but could not turn the season around. The side dropped down to the NIFL Championship in 2019-20 after losing a promotion/relegation play-off to Carrick Rangers.

In May 2019 Feeney signed a two-year contract extension.

OFC Pirin Blagoevgrad 
Feeney joined Bulgarian second division side OFC Pirin Blagoevgrad as manager in November 2019 after a recommendation by an English former teammate who was assisting the side in their recruitment process. The side has recently been acquired by Dubai-based owners who are planning investment in the Bulgarian side. Feeney was joined at the side by fellow Irish footballer Conor Henderson who has been with the club since August 2017.
Feeney went on to lead Pirin Blagoevgrad to the league title and promotion to the A group of Bulgarian football. In early December 2021, Feeney and his technical team were released from Pirin following a  cost cutting strategy at the club.

Welling United
On 14 March 2022, a day after the departure of Peter Taylor, Feeney was appointed manager of Welling United.

Managerial statistics

Honours

As a Manager
Pirin Blagoevgrad
Second Professional Football League: 2020–21

Individual
Second Professional Football League Manager of the Year: 2020–21

References

External links

Northern Ireland stats at Irish FA

1981 births
Living people
Warren
Association footballers from Belfast
People educated at Ashfield Boys' High School
Association footballers from Northern Ireland
Northern Ireland international footballers
Association football forwards
Leeds United F.C. players
AFC Bournemouth players
Stockport County F.C. players
Luton Town F.C. players
Cardiff City F.C. players
Swansea City A.F.C. players
Dundee United F.C. players
Sheffield Wednesday F.C. players
Oldham Athletic A.F.C. players
Plymouth Argyle F.C. players
Salisbury City F.C. players
English Football League players
Scottish Premier League players
Linfield F.C. players
Football managers from Northern Ireland
Linfield F.C. managers
Newport County A.F.C. non-playing staff
Newport County A.F.C. managers
Crawley Town F.C. non-playing staff
Notts County F.C. non-playing staff
PFC Pirin Blagoevgrad managers
Ards F.C. managers
Welling United F.C. managers
Expatriate football managers from Northern Ireland
Expatriate football managers in Bulgaria